Prema is a 1989 Indian Telugu-language musical romance film, produced by D. Ramanaidu under the Rajeswari Films banner and directed by Suresh Krissna in his Telugu film debut. It stars Venkatesh and Revathi, with original soundtrack by Ilaiyaraaja. It was dubbed into Tamil as Anbu Chinnam (1990). Suresh remade the film in Hindi as Love (1991). The film won four Nandi Awards.

Plot 

Pruthvi (Venkatesh) is an orphan who tries hard to become a great singer. One day he comes across a beautiful, naughty young girl Maggi (Revathi Menon), and they both fall in love. When he approaches Maggi's parents to ask her hand in marriage, his criminal background comes into the picture, and they disagree. In the past, Pruthvi has killed his father as he was the reason for his mother's suicide. Pruthvi tries hard to get Maggi's parents' consent, and at last, they agree. Unfortunately, when Maggi kisses Pruthvi on the altar, she loses her consciousness. In the hospital, the doctors tell Pruthvi that she has taken too many medicines for small problems, and now the medicines have poisoned her vital organs. Meanwhile, Pruthvi gets a chance to participate in a singing competition. Maggi, after regaining her consciousness, knows about this and sends Pruthvi to sing. Pruthvi sings and ends up winning the competition. He comes back to Maggi with the trophy. By that time, Maggi's condition becomes critical, and she dies in Pruthvi's hands, saying that she will always be alive in his heart.

Cast 

 Venkatesh as Pruthvi
 Revathi as Maggie
 S. P. Balasubrahmanyam as Satya Rao
 Gollapudi Maruti Rao as Ananda Rao
 Manjula as Stella
Vaishnavi as Lizzie
 Kalpana as Geeta
 Brahmanandam as Gambler
 Rallapalli as House Owner
 Pradeep Shakthi as Peter
 P. L. Narayana as Geetha's Father
 P. J. Sarma as Father
 Chalapathi Rao as Minister
 Bhimaraju as Neighbor
 Gundu Hanumantha Rao as Gambler
 Jenny as S.I. Paramahamsa

Soundtrack 

Music composed by Ilaiyaraaja. Lyrics written by Acharya Aatreya.

Reception 
N. Krishnaswamy of The Indian Express wrote, "A love story that is sometimes put across with a delicacy not found in the general run of films".

Accolades 
Nandi Awards
 Best Actor – Venkatesh
 Special Jury Award – S. P. Balasubrahmanyam
 Best Director – Suresh Krissna
 Best Cinematographer – P. S. Prakash

References

External links 
 

1980s romantic musical films
1980s Telugu-language films
1989 films
Films directed by Suresh Krissna
Films scored by Ilaiyaraaja
Indian romantic musical films
Suresh Productions films
Telugu films remade in other languages